Keita Ono (born December 17, 1987) is a Japanese darts player.

Career
Ono won a Dartslive event in Hong Kong in 2012 by defeating Lourence Ilagan. He claimed the 2013 Japan Open by beating Gordon Dixon in the final. Ono attempted to qualify for the 2014 PDC World Darts Championship, but lost to eventual winner Morihiro Hashimoto in the Semi-final of the Japan Qualifying Event.

Ono qualified for the 2016 PDC World Championship by winning the Japan Qualifying Event. After defeating Alex Tagarao 2–0 in the preliminary round, he lost 3–0 to 16-time world champion Phil Taylor in the first round. Ono made his debut at the World Cup and, together with partner Haruki Muramatsu, they were beaten 5–2 by Northern Ireland in the first round. Ono lost 6–1 in the opening round of the Tokyo Darts Masters to Raymond van Barneveld, but won the Soft Tip Dartslive Premium Stage event by overcoming Boris Krčmar in the final.

World Championship results

PDC
 2016: First round (lost to Phil Taylor 0–3)

References

External links
 Keita Ono on Darts Database

Living people
1987 births
Japanese darts players
PDC World Cup of Darts Japanese team
Professional Darts Corporation associate players